Rupert II may refer to:

 Rupert II, Count of Laurenburg (died c. 1159)
 Rupert II, Elector Palatine (1325–1398)
 Rupert II of Lubin (1396/1402 – 1431)